The 2016 Old Dominion Monarchs football team represented Old Dominion University in the 2016 NCAA Division I FBS football season. The Monarchs played their home games at the Foreman Field at S. B. Ballard Stadium in Norfolk, Virginia and competed in the East Division of Conference USA (C–USA). They were led by eighth-year head coach Bobby Wilder. They finished the season 10–3, 7–1 in C-USA play to finish in a tie for the East Division championship. Due to their head-to-head loss to WKU, they did not represent the East Division in the C-USA Championship Game. They were invited to the Bahamas Bowl, their first ever bowl appearance, where they defeated Eastern Michigan for their first ever bowl victory.

Schedule
Old Dominion announced its 2016 football schedule on February 4, 2016. The 2016 schedule consists of 6 home and away games in the regular season. The Monarchs will host C–USA foes Florida International (FIU), Marshall, Southern Miss, and UTSA, and will travel to Charlotte, Florida Atlantic, UTEP, and Western Kentucky (WKU).

The team will play four non–conference games, two home games against Hampton from the Mid-Eastern Athletic Conference and Massachusetts, and two road games against Appalachian State from the Sun Belt Conference and NC State from the Atlantic Coast Conference (ACC).

The game between Old Dominion and Massachusetts on October 8, 2016, was rescheduled due to Hurricane Matthew. The game was moved a day sooner on October 7, 2016 with an 8:00pm kickoff.

Game summaries

Hampton

This win marked the 100th win in Monarchs football history (1930–40, 2009-).

at Appalachian State

at NC State

UTSA

at Charlotte

Massachusetts

at Western Kentucky

at UTEP

Marshall

Southern Miss

at Florida Atlantic

FIU

Bahamas Bowl–Eastern Michigan

References

Old Dominion
Old Dominion Monarchs football seasons
Bahamas Bowl champion seasons
Old Dominion Monarchs football